Ralph Firman Racing is a British racecar constructor. The company was founded in 2008 by Ralph Firman, Sr.

History
Ralph Firman, Sr. was one of the founders of Van Diemen in 1973 which went on to become one of the leading formula car constructors in the world before being sold to Élan Motorsport Technologies in 1999. After the sale Ralph Firman, Sr. set up a small company near the Snetterton Motor Racing Circuit which became Ralph Firman Racing (RFR) in 2008. In 2009 RFR began to develop Formula 1000 and F2000 Championship Series cars. In both classes the RFR cars won races in their first season in America. In 2012 the RFR Formula 1000 was chosen as the exclusive car for the Middle East-based Formula Gulf 1000. later that same year in September 2012 RFR was asked by Jonathan Palmer to build and develop the car for the new BRDC Formula 4 Championship which made its début in 2013.

RFR currently has dealerships in England, the USA and Australia.

Cars

External links
 RFR Cars
 Firman Cars Australia
 Ralph Firman Racing Cars United States (Firman West Cars)
 Formula Gulf 1000

Automotive motorsports and performance companies
British racecar constructors
Companies based in Norfolk
Vehicle manufacturing companies established in 2008